Parastenolechia collucata is a moth of the family Gelechiidae. It is found in Korea and the Russian Far East.

The wingspan is about 14 mm. Adults are similar to Parastenolechia claustrifera.

References

Moths described in 1988
Parastenolechia